OWL/TV is a Canadian children's educational television series that aired on CBC, from 1985 to 1990, and then later on CTV, from 1990 to 1994. It focused on nature and science discovery, emphasizing to viewers how they can affect their own environment. In the United States, PBS and Showtime also aired the series for a short time. In the United Kingdom, the series also aired on BBC and ITV. Reruns of the series have aired on YTV. A Quebecois French dub of the series also aired as Télé-Hibou on the youth-aimed channel Canal Famille (now Vrak).

Each half-hour program presented cartoon segments mixed with serious themes and contains segments from several recurring themes:

 Mighty Mites: Three kids who possess the magical ability to shrink in size in order to discover microscopic environments.
 Animals Close: Up discovers other aspects of animal life. Kids meet the animals first-hand and see on-the-spot interviews with zoologists and experts on animal behaviour.
 Tomorrow Today: Looks at the future from a kid's point of view, brings kids into working laboratories.
 Real Kids features youths who are actively involved in trying to develop their environment. These are kids who are not afraid to try. Real Kids nurtures the idea that individuals of any age can make a difference.
 You and Your Body: Kids learn about themselves with the help of a wise and funny skeleton named Bonepart (voiced by Michael Lennick).
 Boneparte shares his energy for individual action on behalf of the environment.
 Dr. Zed discovers the connections between nature and science and shows kids exciting experiments.
 The Hoot Club Kids: Set up and work through a project, solving production/performance problems, experimenting with materials, interacting with their community and environment.

This series was based on OWL. Funding for the series was initially provided in part by PBS, with the National Audubon Society serving as a co-producer.

This series' opening theme was performed by voice actress and musician Cree Summer Francks. The lyrics were written by Tim Ryan and music composed by Jonathan Goldsmith.

References

CBC Television original programming
CTV Television Network original programming
1980s Canadian children's television series
1990s Canadian children's television series
1985 Canadian television series debuts
1994 Canadian television series endings
Canadian children's education television series
Canadian television series with live action and animation
Television shows based on magazines
English-language television shows